The Ladies' Gaelic Football All Stars Awards have been hosted annually by the Ladies' Gaelic Football Association since 1980. The All Stars are sponsored by TG4. O'Neills have also helped sponsor the awards. All Stars are awarded to the best Ladies' Gaelic football players in each of the fifteen playing positions, effectively forming an All Star team. Between 1980 and 2002 the All Stars played an annual exhibition game against the winners of the All-Ireland Senior Ladies' Football Championship. Since 2004 the LGFA have organised bi-annual overseas exhibition games featuring two All Star selections. Since 2011 the LGFA has also organised three Player's Player of the Year awards, one each for the Senior, Intermediate and Junior All-Ireland Championships. These awards are announced and presented at the same ceremony as the All Stars. Mary J. Curran of Kerry and Cora Staunton of Mayo hold the all-time record for winning the most All Stars.

All Star Teams

Notes
  Patricia O'Brien (1981 and 1982) of Cavan and Patricia Mimna (1992, 1993 and 1994) of London are the same player. O'Brien is her maiden name while  Mimna is her married name.

2020s

2021 TG4 Ladies Football All Star Team

 Monica McGuirk Meath – 2nd award
 Emma Troy Meath – 1st award
 Mary Kate Lynch Meath – 1st award
 Leah Caffrey Dublin – 3rd award
 Erika O'Shea Cork – 1st award
 Aoibhín Cleary Meath – 1st award
 Orlagh Nolan Dublin – 1st award
 Hannah Looney Cork – 1st award
 Máire O'Shaughnessy Meath – 1st award
 Hannah Tyrrell Dublin – 1st award
 Rachel Kearns Mayo – 2nd award
 Niamh O'Sullivan Meath – 1st award
 Vikki Wall Meath – 1st award
 Emma Duggan Meath – 1st award
 Geraldine McLaughlin Donegal – 1st award

2022 TG4 Ladies Football All Star Team
 Monica McGuirk Meath - 3rd award
 Shauna Ennis Meath - 1st award
 Kayleigh Cronin Kerry - 1st award
 Danielle Caldwell Mayo - 1st award
 Emma Troy Meath - 2nd award
 Aoibhín Cleary Meath - 2nd award
 Cait Lynch Kerry - 2nd award
 Niamh McLaughlin Donegal - 1st award
 Niamh Carmody Kerry - 1st award
 Emma Duggan Meath - 2nd award
 Shauna Howley Mayo - 1st award
 Aimee Macken Armagh 3rd award
 Stacey Grimes Meath - 1st award
 Louise Ni Mhuircheartaigh Kerry - 3rd award

Most Individual All Stars

All Star games
Between 1980 and 2002 the All Stars played an annual exhibition game against the  winners of the All-Ireland Senior Ladies' Football Championship. Since 2004 the Ladies' Gaelic Football Association have organised bi-annual overseas tours featuring two All Star selections. When players are eligible to play for both teams in an exhibition game Replacement All Stars are called up.

Notes
  Match won by Mayo.
  Played before the men's 2004 Connacht Senior Football Championship match between New York and Mayo.
  2015 All Stars win 3–2 on penalties.

Player's Player of the Year

TG4 Senior Player's Player of the Year

TG4 Intermediate Player's Player of the Year

TG4 Junior Player's Player of the Year

References

1980 establishments in Ireland
Awards established in 1980
All Stars
All Stars